Artemisia alaskana, the Alaskan sagebrush or Alaskan wormwood or Siberian wormwood, is a North American species of plants in the sunflower family. It is found in British Columbia, the Yukon, the Northwest Territories, and Alaska. Some authors have considered it as a subspecies as the Russian species A. kruhsiana.

Uses
Alaskan wormwood is used by the larvae of butterflies which are pollinating it. The plant is an important ingredient in some French cuisines, which chefs use as a flavoring. The plant has a medical purpose as well. It can be used as a cough medicine, lowers fever, cures colic and headache, and is great against intestinal parasites and malaria. The shrub emits a strong odor and has a bitter taste related to the terpenoids and sesquiterpene lactones within its cells.

The plant is used in various cosmetics such as enemas, infusions, lotions, and poultices. It is also used in breweries, and can be used as oil to repel fleas and moths from clothes. Moreover, it can be used as an anthelmintic, febrifuge, and stomachic. The plant requires full sun and partial shade, and a dry soil.

References

External links
Flora of British Columbia
Alaska Wildflowers
 University of Michigan at Dearborn: Native American Ethnobotany of  Artemisia alaskana
Circle District Historical Society: Artemisia alaskana (Alaska Wormwood • Alaska Sagebrush)

alaskana
Flora of Alaska
Flora of British Columbia
Flora of the Northwest Territories
Flora of Yukon
Plants described in 1916
Flora without expected TNC conservation status